Claus Lessmann (born 11 September 1960) is a German heavy metal musician and former lead singer of heavy metal band Bonfire. He was the only member and the only singer of Bonfire to have appeared on all of the band's albums. Lessmann was also one of the two original members of the band until January 2015, the other being lead guitarist Hans Ziller. Before joining Bonfire in 1978, he was in the bands Ginger and Sunset. He is currently the vocalist for Phantom 5. Phantom 5 has released two albums.

References 

German heavy metal singers
German male singers
1960 births
Living people
German heavy metal guitarists
German male guitarists